Ramalingam Sudhakar is an Indian Judge. He is former Chief Justice of Manipur High Court. He is also former Acting Chief Justice of Jammu and Kashmir High Court and Judge of Jammu and Kashmir High Court and Madras High Court.
 He was born on 14 February 1959 and hails from Panapakkam Village, Vellore District in Tamil Nadu. He was overlooked and V. Ramasubramanian was  chosen over him as a Supreme Court Judge.
The Central Government has approved the appointment of former Chief Justice of Manipur High Court, Justice Ramalingam Sudhakar as the president of the National Company Law Tribunal (NCLT) for a period of five years in October 28, 2021. Justice Sudhakar has been appointed for a period of five years from the date of appointment or till he attains the age of 67 or until further orders, whichever is earlier.

Education
Sudhakar had his early schooling done in Don Bosco Matriculation School, Egmore, Chennai. He graduated from St. Mary’s Higher Secondary School, Madurai, completing his school education. He graduated from Loyola College, Chennai, with a college degree. He was conferred a Degree in Law from Madras Law College.

Career
Sudhakar enrolled as an advocate and started practice as an associate of the senior advocate Habibullah Badsha, former Advocate General of Tamil Nadu and Public Prosecutor of Madras High Court.

Sudhakar practised in all branches of law and specialized in the field of Customs, Central Excise and Sales Tax Law. Besides Madras High Court, he also practiced, appeared in cases before the High Court of Andhra Pradesh, Karnataka High Court and Kerala High Court. He regularly appeared in matters before the Supreme Court of India as well.

Judgeship
Sudhakar was elevated to the Bench as an Additional Judge of the High Court of Madras on 10 December 2005 and as a Permanent Judge on 20 April 2007. On 18 April 2016, he was appointed a judge of the Jammu and Kashmir High Court. He was the Acting Chief Justice of Jammu and Kashmir High Court, from 15 March 2017 to 31 March 2017, after the retirement of former Chief Justice N. Paul Vasanthakumar, until the appointment of the current Chief Justice,  Badar Durrez Ahmed. He once again assumed the role of Acting Chief Justice after the retirement of Justice Badar Durrez Ahmed, on 16 March 2018.

He was elevated as Chief Justice of Manipur High Court on 18 May 2018.

He retired on 13 February 2021.

Family legacy
His father, S. T. Ramalingam served as a Judge of the Madras High Court. S. P. Sri Ram, his maternal grandfather, served as a District Judge and retired as Chairman of the Sales Tax Appellate Tribunal. He hails from a family actively involved in the Indian independence movement. His maternal great-grandfather S. P. Ayyaswamy Mudaliar, a well known Civil Engineer in the early twentieth century, was an active freedom fighter. During the years  of 1939 and 1940 the family hosted several national leaders and freedom fighters at their house.

References

External links

Living people
1959 births
People from Vellore district
Judges of the Madras High Court
Chief Justices of the Jammu and Kashmir High Court
Chief Justices of Manipur High Court
21st-century Indian judges